The Snake Charmer is a .410 bore, stainless steel, single-shot, break-action shotgun, with an exposed hammer, an 18 1/8 inch barrel, black molded plastic furniture and a short thumb-hole butt-stock that holds four additional 2 1/2 shotgun shells. These light weight 3 1/2 pound guns have an overall length of 28 1/8 inches and will easily fit on the saddle of a horse. They may also be easily disassembled for "storage in a back-pack or large tackle box." They are commonly used by gardeners and farmers for pest control. The term "Snake Charmer" would go on to become synonymous with any small, short-barreled, single-shot, .410 shotgun.

History
The Snake Charmer was introduced in 1978, by H.Koon, Inc, of Dallas, Texas. It originally sold for $89.95 and was marketed as a general purpose utility shotgun perfect for "Fishing - Hunting - Camping - Back Packing - Survival - Home Defense - Truck or Jeep Gun."

Koons would sell the company to Sporting Arms Mfg, of Littlefield, Texas. They added a manual safety switch which blocked the hammer when engaged and re-brand it as the Snake Charmer II. Sporting Arms would introduce the Night Charmer (disc. 1988) which featured a flashlight built into the fore-stock. This flashlight equipped fore-stock was also available as an option and sold separately. Sporting Arms would also introduce a larger version, the Field Gun which featured a full length stock and a 24-inch barrel.

The design was later sold to V.B.E, Inc, of Clay Center, Kansas. They were later made by Verney-Carron. Imported ones would have the importer (Kebco LLC) marked on them.

Other versions

Snake Charmer or Snake Tamer type shotguns are also made by Rossi as well as Harrington and Richardson.

The Rossi Tuffy is a single-shot .410-bore shotgun. It features half-length thumb-hole polymer stock that holds four additional shot-shells and strongly resembles the original Snake Charmer. Unlike its predecessor, it has ejectors that automatically expel spent shells.

The H&R Snake Tamer is also a Snake Charmer like shotgun. Available in 20-gauge or .410-bore/.45 Colt only. These single-shot guns have either a blued finish or an electroless nickel finish with a full-length thumb-hole polymer stock. The right side of the stock is open with storage for three 20-gauge or four .410-bore shotgun shells. It also has ejectors that automatically expel spent shells.

See also
 .410 bore
 Garden guns
 Gauge (firearms)
 Kit gun
 Snake shot
 Snake Slayer

References

External links 

 Pictures of Snake Charmer
 Video of Snake Charmer 410 shotgun. BATJAC J.W
 Video of a Rossi Snake Charmer vs a Copperhead
 Video of Collapsible Shotgun 410 / 45 colt / 12 Ga. NEF Survivor Tamer

Single-shot shotguns of the United States
Survival guns
Takedown guns